The coat of arms of Tuvalu is a shield with a golden border, which is decorated in a pattern with eight mitre shells and eight banana leaves. The shield itself shows a maneapa beneath a blue sky on green grounds. Beneath the ground are stylised depictions in blue and gold of ocean waves. The coat of arms was approved by the College of Arms and granted by royal warrant on 3 December 1976.

The motto is Tuvalu mo te Atua,  Tuvaluan for "Tuvalu for the Almighty". This additionally serves as the title of the Tuvaluan national anthem.

History
The coat of arms of Tuvalu featured on the national flag of Tuvalu in 1995-1996 but the design which was introduced in those years proved to be unpopular. 

The old flag, featuring the British Union Flag in the canton and without the Tuvaluan coat of arms, was reinstated. The coat of arms is still featured on Tuvalu's state flag.

See also
 Flag of Tuvalu#Historical flags

References

Tuvalu
National symbols of Tuvalu
Tuvalu
Tuvalu
Tuvalu
1976 establishments in Tuvalu